Nepean is a federal electoral district in Ontario, Canada that was represented in the House of Commons of Canada from 1988 to 1997, and was reinstated during the 2012 electoral redistribution.

The original riding was created in 1987 from parts of the Nepean—Carleton riding. It consisted of the City of Nepean. The electoral district was abolished in 1996 when it was redistributed between the Nepean—Carleton (54%) and the Ottawa West—Nepean (46%) ridings. The riding was then reinstated in 2012 by Elections Canada, taking effect upon the dropping of the writs for the 2015 federal election, scheduled for 19 October 2015. All of the current riding comes from parts of the former riding of Nepean—Carleton.

Geography
The most recent iteration of the riding of Nepean is formally described by Elections Canada as follows:

Commencing at the intersection of Richmond Road with Highway No. 417; thence southwesterly along said highway to March Road; thence southeasterly along said road and Eagleson Road to Robertson Road; thence northeasterly along said road to Haanel Drive; thence southeasterly in a straight line to the intersection of West Hunt Club Road with Richmond Road; thence southerly along Richmond Road to Hope Side Road; thence southwesterly along said road to Eagleson Road; thence southeasterly along said road to Brophy Drive; thence northeasterly along said drive, Bankfield Road and its northeasterly production to the Rideau River (westerly of Long Island); thence northwesterly and generally northerly along said river (westerly of Long Island and Nicolls Island) to West Hunt Club Road; thence westerly, northwesterly and southwesterly along said road to Merivale Road; thence northwesterly along said road to the Canadian National Railway; thence westerly along said railway to Richmond Road; thence northerly along said road to the point of commencement.

Demographics
According to the Canada 2021 Census

Ethnic groups: 56.0% White, 9.1% South Asian, 7.8% Chinese, 7.5% Arab, 6.9% Black, 3.1% Indigenous, 2.1% Southeast Asian, 2.0% Filipino, 1.6% Latin American, 1.2% West Asian

Languages: 58.8% English, 5.9% French, 5.1% Arabic, 4.0% Mandarin, 1.5% Cantonese, 1.4% Spanish, 1.1% Vietnamese, 1.1% Punjabi
Religions: 49.9% Christian (27.5% Catholic, 3.7% Anglican, 3.2% United Church, 2.2% Christian Orthodox, 1.5% Pentecostal, 11.8% Other), 12.5% Muslim, 3.4% Hindu, 1.7% Buddhist, 1.4% Jewish, 1.3% Sikh, 29.3% None
Median income: $50,400 (2020) 
Average income: $62,200 (2020)

Members of Parliament

The riding has elected the following Members of Parliament:

Riding associations

Riding associations are the local branches of the national political parties:

Election results

Nepean, 2015–present

Nepean, 1993–1997

References

External links
Riding history from the Library of Parliament

Former federal electoral districts of Ontario
Ontario federal electoral districts
Federal electoral districts of Ottawa
1987 establishments in Ontario
1996 disestablishments in Ontario
2013 establishments in Ontario